Michael Rafferty may refer to:

 Michael R. Rafferty, US editor and mayor
 Mike Rafferty (flautist), Irish musician
 Michael Thomas Rafferty, convicted of the murder of Tori Stafford
 Michael Rafferty, main character in TV series Rafferty's Rules
 Mike Rafferty, of Brand New Sin